Fara'id al-Simtayn is a hadith collection by the  Sunni scholar Ibrahim b Muhammad b Himaway al Juwayni, who died in 1322 AD (722 AH). He was born in 644 AH or 1246 CE.

al-Dhahabi has praised him in his book Tadhkirat al-huffaz and writes about the author:

I heard (hadith) from the superior, the most perfect Imam and Muhadith, pride of Islam; Sadr al-deen Ibrahim bin Muhammad Al-Mouayed bin Hamweh Al-Khurasani Al-Juwayni, the Sheikh of Sufis, he came to us to obtain hadith and he narrated for us from two men who were Al-Muayed Al-Tusi's companions, he (Hamweni) was too careful in obtaining the traditions, he was a good reciter, good looking, magisterial, pious and through him Ghazan the king converted to Islam, he died in year 722 in the age of 78. May Allah have mercy on him.

References

Sunni hadith collections